Marques de Souza is a municipality in the state of Rio Grande do Sul, Brazil.

Regional minority language
Riograndenser Hunsrückisch

See also
List of municipalities in Rio Grande do Sul

References

Municipalities in Rio Grande do Sul